The list of museums in North Texas encompasses museums defined for this context  as institutions (including nonprofit organizations, government entities, and private businesses) that collect and care for objects of cultural, artistic, scientific, or historical interest and make their collections or related exhibits available for public viewing.  Also included are non-profit art galleries and exhibit spaces. Museums that exist only in cyberspace (i.e., virtual museums) are not included.

North Texas
  
North Texas (also commonly called North Central Texas, Northeastern Texas and Nortex) is a distinct cultural and geographic area forming the central-northeastern section of the U.S. state of Texas.  North Texas is generally considered to include the area south of Oklahoma, east of Abilene, and north of Waco.  North Texas by this definition is more precisely the northern part of the eastern portion of Texas.

Although the terms "Northeastern Texas" or "North Texas" are not official state designations, there are three groups, totaling 30 counties, generally counted as being in this shared North Texas area: the North Central Texas Council of Governments, with 16 counties; the Nortex Regional Planning Commission, with 11 counties; and the Texoma Council of Governments, with 3 counties. For a full list, in one article, see North Texas#Counties.

Museums in North Texas, listed by county

Archer - Cottle

Dallas

Denton

Ellis - Erath

Fannin - Foard

Grayson

Hardeman - Hunt

Jack - Kaufman

Montague - Navarro

Palo Pinto - Somervell

Tarrant

Wichita-Wilbarger-Wise

Young

Defunct museums
 The American Museum of the Miniature Arts, Dallas
Arlington Sewing Machine Museum, Arlington
 Conspiracy Museum, Dallas, closed in 2006
 Fire Station No.1, Fort Worth former satellite museum of the Fort Worth Museum of Science and History, closed on February 19, 2016
 Hangar 10 Flying Museum, Denton
 Hayden Museum of American Art, Paris, closed in 2010
 Owens Spring Creek Farm, Richardson, operated by Bob Evans Farms, Inc., closed in 2013
 The Women's Museum, Dallas, closed in 2011

See also 

 List of museums in Texas
 List of museums in East Texas
 List of museums in the Texas Gulf Coast
 List of museums in Central Texas
 List of museums in the Texas Panhandle
 List of museums in South Texas
 List of museums in West Texas

References

External links
Texas Association of Museums
Historic House Museums in Texas

Lists of museums in Texas
Tourist attractions in Dallas